"Bowling Balls" is a song written by Esham and Joseph Bruce for Insane Clown Posse's 2004 album Hell's Pit, and the fourth single released by the group that was not produced by Mike E. Clark. The song's lyrics describe decapitation and murder. A short film of the same name was produced in association with the album, appearing on a special edition. Bowling Balls was the first 3-D film shot in high-definition video.

Music and lyricism 

As with the rest of the album, "Bowling Balls" features a hip hop oriented sound and features none of the rock influence of The Wraith: Shangri-La. As opposed to The Wraith: Shangri-La, which focused on the positive aspects of life and death, Hell's Pit focuses on darker subject matter such as hell, murder and psychosis. As produced by Esham, "Bowling Balls" was intended as a throwback to the latter half of Carnival of Carnage, which featured a dark, modest sound. "Bowling Balls" samples the drum beat of Madonna's "Justify My Love," which was based upon Public Enemy's instrumental "Security of the First World", which was in turn based on the end drum break of James Brown's "Funky Drummer". A remix of the song was produced by Monoxide of Twiztid; it appeared on the remix album The Wraith: Remix Albums.

Film 

In promotion of the song and album, Psychopathic Video produced a short film of the same name based around the song, directed by Paul Andresen. A long form music video and comedy horror film, Bowling Balls was the first 3-D film to be shot in high-definition video. The film's cast includes Mark Jury, who later appeared prominently in the Psychopathic film Big Money Rustlas.

The film was released as part of an alternate special edition of Hell's Pit, packaged with a pair of 3-D glasses. 3-D and standard versions of the film were featured on the DVD. The standard version of the film was reissued as part of the compilation Psychopathic: The Videos.

Plot 
Two girls are driving to Daytona when their car breaks down. Rather than sit in an old broken down truck in the middle of nowhere while they wait for their friends to come pick them up, they decide to go with J (Violent J), a clown, who invites them to his bed and breakfast. However, J's ulterior motives are revealed when his retarded hunchback brother, Shaggy (Shaggy 2 Dope), decapitates one of the girls. The girl's friends head to pick them up, and each are murdered by the clowns.

Cast 
Violent J as J
Shaggy 2 Dope as Shaggy
Krista Kalmus as Amy
Lindsay Ballew as Stacy
Kathlyne Pham as Tiffany
Damian Lea as Brad
Sabin Rich as Carl
Mark Jury as Guy in Car
Roxxi Dolt as Girl in Car

References

External links 

2004 films
2004 singles
American comedy horror films
Insane Clown Posse songs
Horrorcore songs
Psychopathic Video films
2000s hip hop films
2000s English-language films
2000s American films